Ripley County Jail, Sheriff's Office and Sheriff's Residence, also known as the Hancock Building, is a historic jail and sheriff's residence located at Doniphan, Ripley County, Missouri.  It was built in 1899, and consists of a two-story front section containing the residence, with a one-story rear section containing the sheriff's office and the county jail.  The building is constructed of brick, rests on a limestone foundation, and topped by a medium pitched hipped roof. It housed the jail and sheriff's office and residence until 1960.

It was added to the National Register of Historic Places in 1991.

References

Jails on the National Register of Historic Places in Missouri
Government buildings completed in 1899
Buildings and structures in Ripley County, Missouri
National Register of Historic Places in Ripley County, Missouri